Jeremiah McDade is a Canadian folk musician.

Career
McDade was a performer when he was five years old. With his parents, Terry and Danielle, brother, Solon and sister, Shannon Johnson he played in the McDade family band and performed a variety of shows in Canada. They have also performed for the British royal family. Jeremiah McDade is a graduate of McGill University and MacEwan University. Jeremiah McDade received a distinguished alumni award from MacEwan University, where he studied jazz. He, his brother Solon, and sister Shannon formed the McDades in 2000. Their second album, Bloom, received the Juno Award for best roots/traditional album by a group, an Independent Music Award, and two Canadian Folk Music Awards.

For nine years, McDade had a kidney disease which worsened until he could no longer work. In 2010 he received a successful kidney transplant from his cousin. McDade is now based out of Edmonton, Alberta where he continues to perform and record with a variety of artists.

Discography
With The McDades
 2006 Bloom 
 2002 For Reel

With Terry McDade
 Harpe Danse (Free Radio, 1998)
 Midwinter (Free Radio, 2003)
 Noel (Free Radio, 2004)
 Winter Rose (Free Radio, 2011)

With Maria Dunn
 From Where I Stand
 For a Song
 We Were Good People
 The Peddler
 Piece By Piece
 Gathering

With Solon McDade
 Murals

References

External links
The McDades official site

1977 births
Living people
Canadian folk musicians
Canadian people of Irish descent
Musicians from Edmonton
MacEwan University alumni
McGill University alumni
Date of birth missing (living people)